Jiang Xinzhi (born February 1958), is a Chinese politician, serving as a senior official within the Chinese Communist Party. Since November 2017, he has been serving as the executive Deputy Head of the party’s Organization Department, under Chen Xi.

Biography
Jiang was born in 1958, in Dunhuang, Gansu, and graduated from Lanzhou University with a degree in political economics. In the early 1980s, Jiang would serve as a finance and trade school teacher. Beginning in 1983, he would work for the Gansu provincial Party Committee Organization Department.

In 1990, Jiang was appointed Deputy Secretary of the Anning District in Lanzhou. By 1994, he was appointed deputy director of the Gansu provincial Organization Department, and by 1995, was appointed Director. In 2003, he would be moved to the Linxia Hui Autonomous Prefecture, and would serve as Chairman of its National People’s Congress Standing Committee. In 2007, he was appointed Communist Party Secretary of the Linxia Hui Autonomous Prefecture, a post he would hold until 2011.

In 2011, he was transferred to Fujian, where he would serve in its provincial organization department until 2015. In November 2015, he was made a deputy head of the Central Party Organization Department, and by November 2017, was its Executive Deputy Head, with full ministerial rank.

Jiang is a member of the 19th Central Commission for Discipline Inspection.

References

1958 births
People's Republic of China politicians from Gansu
People from Dunhuang
Living people
Lanzhou University alumni
Members of the 14th Chinese People's Political Consultative Conference